Vater Seidl und sein Sohn is a German television series. It is a remake of the 1954 television series of the same title.

See also
List of German television series

External links
 

1976 German television series debuts
1979 German television series endings
Television shows set in Munich
German-language television shows
Das Erste original programming